Joan Lunden (born Joan Elise Blunden, September 19, 1950) is an American journalist, an author, and a television host. Lunden was the co-host of ABC's Good Morning America from 1980 to 1997, and has authored over ten books. She has appeared on the Biography program and Biography Channel.

, Lunden is a special correspondent for NBC's Today. In 2021, Lunden became host of the public television program Second Opinion.

Early life
Lunden was born in Sacramento County, California, the daughter of Gladyce Lorraine (née Somervill) and Dr. Erle Murray Blunden, a physician.

She earned a Liberal Arts degree from California State University, Sacramento.

Later she studied Spanish and anthropology at the former Mexico City campus of Universidad de Las Americas. She was a visiting instructor at Montclair State College in New Jersey, where she taught a course in broadcast journalism. Her first news anchor job was at KCRA-TV. She began her broadcasting career in Sacramento, California, where she worked for Channel 3 (KCRA) and radio as co-anchor of the daily noon television news program. She produced the noon news broadcast and hosted KCRA's television specials.

Career

Good Morning America
In 1975, Lunden joined New York's WABC-TV Eyewitness News, at which time her name was changed to avoid being called "Blunder". A year later, she became co-anchor on the weekend newscasts. Lunden joined GMA in the fall of 1976 as a feature news/consumer reporter, and later became fill-in co-host when former co-host Sandy Hill left to work on ABC's coverage of the 1976 Winter Olympics.

Her popularity led to her quick promotion to co-host with David Hartman, the program's original host, in 1980. Later, she would spend the majority of her career hosting with ABC's Charlie Gibson. She reported from 26 countries, covered four presidents, five Olympic Games, and two royal weddings. Her popularity on the GMA program from the 1970s through the 1990s allowed her to interview U.S. Presidents and First Ladies Gerald and Betty Ford, Jimmy and Rosalynn Carter, Ronald and Nancy Reagan, George and Barbara Bush, Bill and Hillary Clinton, and also Texas Governor George W. Bush and Laura Bush prior to his election as president in 2000.

As the co-host of GMA, Lunden traveled the world, covering historic events, such as the 50th anniversary of VE Day (Victory in Europe) in 1995; the 50th anniversary of D-Day; the 1984 and 1988 Winter Olympic Games in Sarajevo and Calgary, respectively; and the wedding of Prince Charles and Diana, Princess of Wales. She covered the administrations and inaugurations of three presidents — Bill Clinton, George H. W. Bush, and Ronald Reagan. She was one of only three American journalists to interview Prince Charles during his 1983 visit to the United States.

Lunden was known for her willingness to take risks in her role as host. She climbed and rappelled Alaska's famed Mendenhall Glacier and  bungee-jumped off a 143-foot bridge and paraglided off a 2,000-foot mountain during the program's highly rated trip to New Zealand. She navigated the whitewater rapids of a Georgia river for a GMA show in 1994.  Lunden left GMA after 17 years as co-host with her last day being on September 5, 1997.

Hosting and other work
Lunden was a host on the A&E cable network program Behind Closed Doors (originally aired on ABC as occasional primetime specials; 1996–2001), an on-location, undercover reporter program. She also frequently guest hosted A&E's Biography, and hosted the Newborn Channel's Parenting Minutes.  She has also hosted Taking Care With Joan Lunden on Retirement Living TV.  In 2014, Lunden returned to morning television as a special correspondent for NBC's Today.  

Her most recent television shows include hosting DirectTV's series Hometown Heroes and the Emmy-winning special America's Invisible Children.  In 2021, Lunden took over as host of the public television program Second Opinion.

Lunden also hosts Health Corner, a Lifetime series sponsored by Walgreens. She is currently the spokesperson for A Place for Mom, a national senior care referral service.

She is also a public speaker in breast cancer awareness advocacy.

London has guest-starred on episodes of Murphy Brown, Home Improvement and All My Children. She also made cameo appearances in the films What About Bob?, Free Willy 2: The Adventure Home, Conspiracy Theory and Thank You for Smoking.

Career timeline
 1975–2000: ABC News
 1975–1980: WABC reporter
 1976–1980: WABC anchor
 1976–1980: Good Morning America correspondent and fill-in anchor
 1980–1997: Good Morning America co-anchor
 1997–2000: ABC News correspondent
 2007–2014: Retirement Living TV host/reporter
 September 30, 2014 – present: NBC Today Show special correspondent

Activities
Lunden has earned numerous honors and awards, including the Spirit of Achievement Award from the Albert Einstein College of Medicine; National Women's Political Caucus Award; New Jersey Division of Civil Rights Award; Baylor University Outstanding Woman of the Year; and the YWCA Outstanding Woman's Award. The New York Association for Women in Communications honored Lunden with a Matrix Award for her outstanding contributions to the broadcasting field.

She was voted "Career Mother of the Year" by the National Institute of Infant Services, and in 1982–1983, honoring her dedication to motherhood, she was voted "Mother of the Year" by the National Mother's Day Committee. She has been a national spokesperson for Mothers Against Drunk Driving.

Lunden hosted ABC's broadcast of the Rose Parade in Pasadena, California, from 1989 to 1991, and from 1983 to 1996, she hosted the Walt Disney World Easter and Christmas Parades along with Alan Thicke and Regis Philbin.

In April 1991, Lunden was honored by New York Women in Communications with a Matrix Award for her "outstanding contributions to the broadcasting field." She also appeared on the cover of Woman's Day in 2004.

Lunden is involved in various personal projects, such as her Camp Reveille, a summer weekend getaway for women of all ages in Naples, Maine.

Lunden is on the board of PassportMD, an online personal health record system that uses Microsoft HealthVault, which allows families to maintain and organize their family health records.

On March 28, 2016, it was announced that Lunden would be presented the WWE's second annual Warrior Award at the 2016 WWE Hall of Fame Induction Ceremony on Saturday, April 2, 2016.

Personal life
Lunden was married to Michael A. Krauss from 1978 until their divorce in 1992. The couple has three daughters: Jamie Beryl Krauss, born July 4, 1980; Lindsay Leigh Krauss; and Sarah Emily Krauss. Lunden converted to Judaism when marrying Krauss.
She married the owner of Camp Takajo, Jeff Konigsberg on April 18, 2000. They have four children, two sets of twins, Jack, Kim (born 2005), Kate and Max (born 2003), born with the help of a surrogate mother. Lunden has become a spokeswoman for surrogacy.

On Tuesday, June 24, 2014, Lunden revealed on Good Morning America that she had been  diagnosed with breast cancer.

Books
 Good Morning I'm Joan Lunden —  (1986)
 Mother's Minutes —  (1986)
 Your Newborn Baby —  (1988)
 Joan Lunden's Healthy Cooking —  (1996)
 Joan Lunden's Healthy Living —  (1997)
 A Bend in the Road is not the End of the Road: 10 Positive Principles For Dealing With Change —  (1998)
 Wake Up Calls: Making the Most Out of Every Day (Regardless of What Life Throws You) —  (2000)
 Growing Up Healthy: Protecting Your Child From Diseases Now Through Adulthood —  (2004)
 Chicken Soup for the Soul: Thanks Mom: 101 Stories of Gratitude, Love and Good Times —  (Forward) (2010)
 Chicken Soup for the Soul: Family Caregivers: 101 Stories of Love, Sacrifice and Bonding —  (2012)
 Had I Known: A Memoir of Survival —  (2015)
 Why Did I Come into This Room?: A Candid Conversation about Aging —  (2020)

Video
 Workout America (1994) (exercise video)

Awards and honors 
 WWE
 WWE Hall of Fame (Class of 2016, Warrior Award)
2017 recipient of the National Association of Broadcasters Distinguished Service Award.

See also 
 New Yorkers in journalism

References

External links
 
 

American television reporters and correspondents
1950 births
Living people
American women television journalists
ABC News personalities
20th-century American Jews
California State University, Sacramento alumni
Television anchors from New York City
Television anchors from Sacramento, California
Writers from Sacramento, California
Converts to Judaism
WWE Warrior Award recipients
20th-century American journalists
21st-century American journalists
People from Fair Oaks, California
21st-century American women
21st-century American Jews
20th-century American women